Geocalamus is a genus of amphisbaenians in the family Amphisbaenidae. Species in the genus are commonly known as worm lizards. Two species are placed in this genus.

Species
The following species are recognized as being valid.
Geocalamus acutus  – wedge-snouted worm lizard
Geocalamus modestus  – Mpwapwa wedge-snouted worm lizard

References

Further reading

Gans C (2005). "Checklist and Bibliography of the Amphisbaenia of the World". Bulletin of the American Museum of Natural History (289): 1-130.

 
Lizard genera
Taxa named by Albert Günther